Ahmed El Siady (born April 15, 1992) is an Egyptian professional footballer who plays as a centre forward for the Egyptian club El-Entag El-Harby. He played for Gomhoriat Shebin in Egyptian Second Division before moving to ENPPI. In 2014, Al Nasr signed him in a free agent transfer for 3 years, but he moved to Ismaily after two years and signed a 5-year contract, he managed to score only 1 goal in 22 matches with the club. In 2017, he joined El-Entag El-Harby with a 3-year contract.

References

External links
Ahmed El Saidy at KOOORA.com

Living people
1992 births
Egyptian footballers
Association football forwards
ENPPI SC players
Al Nasr SC (Egypt) players
Ismaily SC players
El Entag El Harby SC players